Freestyle Session is a b-boy competition held every year which crowns the best crew in the world. It is sanctioned by the Urban Dance & Educational Foundation and part of the Pro Breaking Tour and Undisputed's World BBoy Series. Originally held only in the United States, Freestyle Session is now being recognized worldwide. Most years have featured a 3 on 3 battle, but formats have varied over the years, from a 2 on 2 to a 10 on 10 full crew battle. Freestyle Session is most well known as a b-boy event, but has also featured b-girl, youth breaking, popping, and open styles competitions, among others 

In 2013, Freestyle Session set off to raise the bar of International Competition with a series of events from local preliminaries to Regional Qualifiers and ultimately the Freestyle Session World Finals to find out who is the best crew in the World. Since 2014, Freestyle Session partnered up with The World BBoy Series and helped create Undisputed, an event to crown the solo world bboy champion.

Freestyle Session Championship results

Freestyle Session Solo Champions results

From 2014, the winner of Freestyle Session Solo qualifies to Undisputed.

2019
Location: San Diego{{32TeamBracket|compact=yes|seeds=no
| team-width=14em
|RD1= Round of 32
|RD2= Round of 16
|RD3= Quarter-finals
|RD4= Semi-finals
|RD5= Final

| RD1-team01= BC One All-Stars
| RD1-score01=W
| RD1-team02= "Windbreakers"
| RD1-score02=L

| RD1-team03= Pelisgrosos
| RD1-score03=L
| RD1-team04= Body Carnival
| RD1-score04=W

| RD1-team05= Motion Disorderz
| RD1-score05=W
| RD1-team06= Crossover Crew
| RD1-score06=L

| RD1-team07= NarekTheShow, MicShaggy, Jerry
| RD1-score07=L
| RD1-team08= Rock Force
| RD1-score08=W

| RD1-team09= HZK Floor Gangz
| RD1-score09=L
| RD1-team10= Nothing 2 Lose
| RD1-score10=W

| RD1-team11= RAW Minds
| RD1-score11=L
| RD1-team12= Monster
| RD1-score12=W

| RD1-team13= Hoolukunz Rhythm Invade
| RD1-score13=L
| RD1-team14= 3:16
| RD1-score14=W

| RD1-team15= Smac 19
| RD1-score15=L
| RD1-team16= 808 Breakers
| RD1-score16=W

| RD1-team17= CrazyStan
| RD1-score17=W
| RD1-team18= Break Syndicate
| RD1-score18=L

| RD1-team19= Monster MZK
| RD1-score19=W
| RD1-team20= Knucklehead Zoo
| RD1-score20=L

| RD1-team21= Belgium With Attitude
| RD1-score21=W
| RD1-team22= Drifterz
| RD1-score22=L

| RD1-team23= Juice Crew
| RD1-score23=W
| RD1-team24= Underground Flow
| RD1-score24=L

| RD1-team25= Boogie Renaissance
| RD1-score25=W
| RD1-team26= Illusion of Exist
| RD1-score26=L

| RD1-team27= United Rivals
| RD1-score27=L
| RD1-team28= German Ingenuity
| RD1-score28=W

| RD1-team29= Ariya
| RD1-score29=L
| RD1-team30= Renegade Lords
| RD1-score30=W

| RD1-team31= Bring It Back
| RD1-score31=W
| RD1-team32= Florida H-Town
| RD1-score32=L

| RD2-team01= CrazyStan
| RD2-score01=W
| RD2-team02= Boogie Renaissance
| RD2-score02=L

| RD2-team03= German Ingenuiety
| RD2-score03=L
| RD2-team04= Renegade Lords
| RD2-score04=W

| RD2-team05= Motion Disorderz
| RD2-score05=L
| RD2-team06= Rock Force
| RD2-score06=W

| RD2-team07= 808 Breakers
| RD2-score07=L
| RD2-team08= Nothing 2 Lose
| RD2-score08=W

| RD2-team09= Juice Crew
| RD2-score09=L
| RD2-team10= Monster
| RD2-score10=W

| RD2-team11= Body Carnival
| RD2-score11=W
| RD2-team12= Bring it Back
| RD2-score12=L

| RD2-team13= Monster MZK
| RD2-score13=L
| RD2-team14= Belgium With Attitude
| RD2-score14=W

| RD2-team15= 3:16
| RD2-score15= L
| RD2-team16= BC One All-Stars
| RD2-score16=W

| RD3-team01= Belgium With Atittude
| RD3-score01=W
| RD3-team02= Body Carnival
| RD3-score02=L

| RD3-team03= CrazyStan
| RD3-score03=L
| RD3-team04= BC One All-Stars
| RD3-score04=W

| RD3-team05= Rock Force
| RD3-score05=W
| RD3-team06= Monster
| RD3-score06=L

| RD3-team07= Nothing 2 Lose
| RD3-score07=L
| RD3-team08= Renegade Lords
| RD3-score08=W

| RD4-team01= BC One All-Stars
| RD4-score01=W
| RD4-team02= Rock Force
| RD4-score02=L

| RD4-team03= Belgium With Attitude
| RD4-score03=L
| RD4-team04= ''Renegade Lords| RD4-score04=W| RD5-team01= BC One All-Stars| RD5-score01=W| RD5-team02= Renegade Lords
| RD5-score02=L
}}

2018
Location: Los Angeles

Date: November 10–11, 2018

Individuals in bold won their respective battles.

2017
Location: San Diego

Date: August 26–27, 2017

Individuals in bold won their respective battles.

20th Anniversary: The Return of the Crew Battle
Location: Los Angeles

Date: November 11–12, 2017

Individuals in bold won their respective battles.

Winning Bboys:  Moy,  Zeku,  Gravity,  Jeremy,  Tata  Kareem  Jeffro,  Boxwon,  Pocket, and  Benji.

2016
Location: Los Angeles, California

Date: November 12, 2016

Individuals in bold won their respective battles.

2015
Location: Los Angeles, California

Date: November 8, 2015

Individuals in bold won their respective battles.

After winning Freestyle Session, the second to last event of the World BBoy Series, Victor earned a double pass to Undisputed.

2014
Starting in 2014, Freestyle Session began hosting solo or 1-on-1 b-boy battles. This was a result of partnering up with The World BBoy Series and Undisputed, an event to crown the solo world bboy champion. By winning Freestyle Session, El Niño earned the seventh bid to the Undisputed World BBoy Series at the end of the 2014 year.

Location: San Diego, California

Date: November 8, 2014

Individuals in bold''' won their respective battles.

References

External links
 Freestyle Session Official Site

Breakdance
Street dance competitions